Amidon is a city in, and the county seat of Slope County, North Dakota, United States.

Amidon was the smallest incorporated county seat at the 2000 census. When the 2020 census reported its population as 24, it became the second-smallest incorporated county seat after Brewster, Nebraska, with a population of 17. In 2000, Amidon had 26 people to Brewster's 29.

There are two other unincorporated county seats that are smaller: Mentone, Texas (population 19), the county seat of Loving County, and Gann Valley, South Dakota (population 14), the county seat of Buffalo County, South Dakota.
 
Located on U.S. 85 approximately 31 miles (50 km) north of Bowman, it is the closest city to White Butte.

Namesake
Amidon is named after Charles F. Amidon, federal judge for the United States District Court for the District of North Dakota.

History
Amidon was founded in 1910 at the anticipated terminus of a Milwaukee Road branch line that diverged from the railroad's Pacific Extension in McLaughlin, South Dakota. The line was ultimately never built farther west of New England, North Dakota, making Amidon one of the few surviving North Dakota cities never to have been served by a rail line. The original county courthouse was built in 1915. It was also the last county seat in the state to get electricity when Slope Electric Cooperative extended their distribution lines into Amidon in 1950.

Geography
Amidon is located at  (46.483042, -103.322251).

Demographics

2010 census
As of the census of 2010, there were 20 people, 11 households, and 7 families residing in the city. The racial makeup of the city was 100.0% White.

There were 11 households, of which 9.1% had children under the age of 18 living with them, 63.6% were married couples living together, and 36.4% were non-families. 36.4% of all households were made up of individuals, and 27.3% had someone living alone who was 65 years of age or older. The average household size was 1.82 and the average family size was 2.29.

The median age in the city was 64 years. 10% of residents were under the age of 18; 0.0% were between the ages of 18 and 24; 15% were from 25 to 44; 25% were from 45 to 64; and 50% were 65 years of age or older. The gender makeup of the city was 50.0% male and 50.0% female.

2000 census
As of the census of 2000, there were 26 people, 14 households, and 9 families residing in the city. The population density was 41.2 people per square mile (15.9/km2). There were 17 housing units at an average density of 26.9 per square mile (10.4/km2). The racial makeup of the city was 100.00% White.

There were 14 households, out of which 14.3% had children under the age of 18 living with them, 57.1% were married couples living together, 7.1% had a female householder with no husband present, and 35.7% were non-families. 35.7% of all households were made up of individuals, and 28.6% had someone living alone who was 65 years of age or older. The average household size was 1.86 and the average family size was 2.33.

In the city, the population was spread out, with 15.4% under the age of 18, 19.2% from 25 to 44, 38.5% from 45 to 64, and 26.9% who were 65 years of age or older. The median age was 50 years. For every 100 females, there were 85.7 males. For every 100 females age 18 and over, there were 83.3 males.

The median income for a household in the city was $27,188, and the median income for a family was $31,250. Males had a median income of $36,250 versus $16,250 for females. The per capita income for the city was $18,765. None of the population and none of the families were below the poverty line.

Climate
According to the Köppen Climate Classification system, Amidon has a semi-arid climate, abbreviated "BSk" on climate maps.

Education
Residents were within Central Elementary Public School District 32, which operated Amidon Elementary School. The district was scheduled to dissolve on July 1, 2020.

References

External links

 Ghost Towns in North Dakota
 Photos of Amidon

Cities in North Dakota
Cities in Slope County, North Dakota
County seats in North Dakota
Populated places established in 1911
1910 establishments in North Dakota